Janet Laurel Adamson (née Johnston; 9 May 1882 – 25 April 1962) was a British Labour Party politician who served as a Member of Parliament (MP) from 1938 to 1946, and as a junior minister in Clement Attlee's post-war Labour government.

Early life and family 

Janet Laurel Johnston was born on 9 May 1882, the daughter of Thomas Johnston of Kirkcudbright. She married, in 1902, to William Murdoch Adamson, a Transport and General Workers' Union official who became Labour MP for Cannock.

Political career 
From 1928 to 1931, Adamson was a member of London County Council for Lambeth North. She served on the National Executive Committee of the Labour Party from 1927 to 1947, which she chaired from 1935 to 1936.

Adamson unsuccessfully contested Dartford at the 1935 general election, when the sitting Conservative MP Frank Clarke held the seat with a significantly reduced majority. 
However, Clarke died in July 1938, and at the resulting by-election in November 1938, Adamson won the seat on a swing of 4.2%. With her husband, she became the only husband and wife in the House of Commons.

The constituency was divided in boundary changes for the 1945 general election, when Adamson was elected with a large majority (27% of the votes) for the new Bexley constituency.  She served as a Parliamentary Private Secretary from 1940 to 1945 and Parliamentary Secretary to the Ministry of Pensions from 1945 to 1946, under minister Wilfred Paling.

Adamson resigned from Parliament in 1946, becoming Deputy Chair of the Unemployment Assistance Board from 1946 to 1953. Her resignation precipitated a by-election in July 1946 which was narrowly won by the Labour candidate Ashley Bramall.  At the next general election, in 1950, the seat was won by future Prime Minister Edward Heath.

Adamson died on 25 April 1962.

References

Citations

Bibliography
 Stenton, M., Lees, S. (1981). Who's Who of British Members of Parliament, volume iv (covering 1945-1979). Sussex: The Harvester Press; New Jersey: Humanities Press.

External links 
 

1882 births
1962 deaths
Labour Party (UK) MPs for English constituencies
Female members of the Parliament of the United Kingdom for English constituencies
UK MPs 1935–1945
UK MPs 1945–1950
Members of London County Council
Chairs of the Labour Party (UK)
20th-century British women politicians
Ministers in the Attlee governments, 1945–1951
20th-century English women
20th-century English people
Women councillors in England